The Emblem of Nagaland is the official seal of the government of the Indian state of Nagaland. It was designed by local artist Merimvü Doulo and was officially adopted in August 2005.

Design

The emblem of Nagaland is a circular seal depicting a Mithun bison standing on a green hilly landscape, surrounded by the motto "Unity" and the words "Government of Nagaland".

Government banner
The Government of Nagaland can be represented by a banner displaying the emblem of the state on a white field.

See also
 National Emblem of India
 List of Indian state emblems

References

External links
 Government of Nagaland

Government of Nagaland
Nagaland
Symbols of Nagaland